Tommy Clarence Fredrik Johnson (5 December 1931, in Stockholm – 17 July 2005, in Stockholm) was a Swedish actor. He worked at Uppsala City Theatre and Malmö City Theatre. In 1988 he received the Cornelis Vreeswijk Scholarship.

Selected filmography
1964 - Vi på Saltkråkan (TV)
1968 - Badarna
1969 - Kråkguldet (TV)
1971 - Badjävlar (TV film)
1973 - Någonstans i Sverige (TV)
1976 - Fleksnes Fataliteter (TV)
1977 - Bröderna Lejonhjärta
1981 - Rasmus på luffen
1982 - Polisen som vägrade svara (TV)
1983 - Second Dance
1983 - Farmor och vår Herre (TV)
1983 - Midvinterduell (TV film)
1984 & 1988 - Träpatronerna (TV)
1984 - The Man from Majorca
1988 - Kråsnålen (TV)
1993 - Kådisbellan
1993 - Murder at the Savoy
1994 - Sommarmord
1995 - Snoken (TV)
1997 - Spring för livet
1998 - Tre Kronor (TV series)

References

Male actors from Stockholm
2005 deaths
1931 births